Richard Barker (c. 1554 – 1636), was an English politician.

He was a member (MP) of the Parliament of England for Shrewsbury in 1584 and 1604.

References

1550s births
1636 deaths
English MPs 1584–1585
English MPs 1604–1611